Dave's Picks Volume 7 is a three-CD live album by the rock band the Grateful Dead. It contains the complete concert from April 24, 1978, at the Horton Field House, Illinois State University, in Normal, Illinois. It was produced as a limited edition of 13,000 numbered copies, and was released on August 1, 2013.

Critical reception
On AllMusic, Fred Thomas said, "Ending the first leg of their 1978 spring tour, the Grateful Dead pulled into the relatively tiny town of Normal, Illinois in late April of 1978 to deliver one of their legendarily epic concert experiences. Dave's Picks, the archive series that picks up where the seemingly inexhaustible Dick's Picks left off, captures the performance in total of over two hours of recordings."

Track listing
Disc 1
First set:
"Promised Land" (Chuck Berry) – 5:14
"Ramble On Rose" (Jerry Garcia, Robert Hunter) – 8:07
"Me and My Uncle" > (John Phillips) – 3:10
"Big River" (Johnny Cash) – 6:21
"Friend of the Devil" (Garcia, Hunter) – 9:33
"Cassidy" (Bob Weir, John Perry Barlow) – 5:38
"Brown-Eyed Women" (Garcia, Hunter) – 5:57
"Passenger" (Phil Lesh, Peter Monk) – 5:45
"It Must Have Been the Roses" (Garcia, Hunter) – 8:07
"The Music Never Stopped" (Weir, Barlow) – 8:51
Disc 2
Second set:
"Scarlet Begonias" > (Garcia, Hunter) – 12:55
"Fire on the Mountain" > (Mickey Hart, Hunter) – 11:08
"Good Lovin'" (Rudy Clark, Arthur Resnick) – 7:06
Disc 3
"Terrapin Station" > (Garcia, Hunter) – 10:51
"Rhythm Devils" > (Hart, Bill Kreutzmann) – 13:53
"Space" > (Garcia, Keith Godchaux, Lesh, Weir) – 6:41
"Not Fade Away" > (Buddy Holly, Norman Petty) – 11:19
"Black Peter" > (Garcia, Hunter) – 11:47
"Around and Around" (Berry) – 9:11
Encore:
"Werewolves of London" (LeRoy Marinell, Waddy Wachtel, Warren Zevon) – 7:46

Personnel
Grateful Dead
Jerry Garcia – lead guitar, vocals
Donna Jean Godchaux – vocals
Keith Godchaux – keyboards
Mickey Hart – drums and percussion
Bill Kreutzmann – drums and percussion
Phil Lesh – bass guitar, vocals
Bob Weir – rhythm guitar, vocals
Production
Produced by Grateful Dead
Produced for release by David Lemieux
CD mastering: Jeffrey Norman
Cover art: Timothy Truman
Recorded by Betty Cantor-Jackson
Tape research: Michael Wesley Johnson

References

2013 live albums
07
Rhino Entertainment live albums